The Italian regional elections of 16 April 2000 were won by the Pole for Freedoms coalition, led by Silvio Berlusconi.

Due to the electoral defeat suffered by The Olive Tree coalition, D'Alema resigned as Prime Minister of Italy.

Overall results

Regional councils

Presidents of the regions

Results by region

Piedmont

Lombardy

Veneto

Liguria

Emilia-Romagna

Tuscany

Umbria

Marche

Lazio

Abruzzo

Molise

Campania

Basilicata

Apulia

Calabria

References

External links
Ministry of the Interior – Electoral Archive

Elections in Italian regions
2000 elections in Italy
April 2000 events in Europe